Bradford Power Station (also known as Valley Road Power Station) was an electricity generating site located on Valley Road in Bradford, West Yorkshire, England. The plant operated for 79 years and had cooling towers constructed from wood and was noted for its  chimney that was supposed to vent smoke away from the valley floor in Bradford Dale that the power station was located on.

The commissioning of a power station in Bradford as operated by the Bradford Corporation, made it the first municipal supplier of electricity in the United Kingdom.

History
In 1882, the United Kingdom Government passed the Electric Lighting Act. This allowed individuals, private companies and corporations the right to build and operate their own power generating sites. The Bradford Corporation, who also supplied water and other services to the City of Bradford, applied for a license and were granted one in 1883, though they did not commission anything until 1887 when a small generating site was built on Bolton Road. This made the Bradford Corporation the first municipal provider of electricity in the United Kingdom. In 1889, the power was used in the private homes of 43 consumers. In 1897 the plant had a generating capacity of 2019 kW and the maximum load was 1123 kW. A total of 977.12 MWh of electricity was sold which powered 68,843 lamps, this provided an income to the corporation of £18,552-12-7d.

By 1960, the power station on Valley Road was supplying electricity to over 134,000 homes.

The first conversion of an urban tramway system from horse to electric power was in Bradford in 1892 supplied from Bolton Road.

By the middle of the 1890s, it was clear that the original site in Bolton Road was not capable of generating the electrical needs of the growing city and so another site was commissioned between Canal Road and Valley Road in the north of the city which adjoined the Leeds and Bradford Railway lines approaching Forster Square station. The foundation stone was laid in June 1896 with Bradford Power Station opening a year later in 1897. The power station's location in the north end of the city, low in the valley of Bradforddale, meant that a  chimney was constructed to vent the smoke away from the valley floor. The valley floor was heavily polluted by industries burning low carbon coal, so an order was instituted before the power station was built stipulating that chimneys were to be at least  in height.

In 1911 the first electric trolley buses were introduced Bradford and Leeds.

By 1923 the generating plant comprised both AC and DC machinery. The AC plant included three 3,000 kW, one 5,000 kW and two 12,000 kW turbo-alternators (a total of 38,000 kW) which supplied 3-phase, 50 Hz AC at 400 and 230 Volts. The 230 and 460 volt DC supply was generated by a 1,000 kW reciprocating machine. In 1923 the maximum load on the system was 32,640 kW from 75,175 connections from consumers. The total number of units sold that year was 65,456,551 kWh raising £440,091. The surplus of revenue over expenses was £231,871.

In 1931 a topping turbine was installed at Valley Road. This was an English Electric Company 2.5 MW, 6,000 rpm machine. It used steam at 1,100 psi and 800 °F (75.9 bar and 427 °C), which exhausted to existing steam mains at 205 psi (14.1 bar).

A new turbo power generator was installed on the site in 1930. It was named Princess Mary and was unveiled by its namesake Princess Mary. This made Bradford Power station the most powerful generating concern under local authority control at that time. The power station was extended in 1939 and again in 1947, so that by its closure in 1976, it was capable of generating 70 megaWatts of power. The timber towers had a capacity of 5.335 million gallons per hour (6.74 m3/s). By the time of its closure, the power station also had one conventional concrete cooling tower at the northern end of the site besides retaining many of the original wooden towers. The concrete tower had a capacity of 1.25 million gallons per hour (1.58 m3/s).

Coal was railed into the site via a conveyor system located on the western side of the station via the Midland Railway sidings in Valley Road.

Upon nationalisation of the British electricity supply industry in 1948 the ownership of Bradford power station was vested in the British Electricity Authority, and subsequently the Central Electricity Authority and the Central Electricity Generating Board (CEGB). The electricity distribution and sales functions were vested in the Yorkshire Electricity Board.

By the late 1950s the station comprised six Babcock & Wilcox boilers with a total evaporative capacity of 1,080,000 pounds per hour (136.1 kg/s) operating at 650 psi at 850 °F (44.8 bar at 454 °C). There were five turbo-alternators: one 20 MW and one 30 MW English Electric (6.6 kV); one 30 MW English Electric (33 kV); one 22.5 MW (6.6 kV) and one 22.5 MW (33 kV) Parsons sets.

The output of the station in the late 1950s and early 1960s  was:

In 1971 the station had an installed capacity of 75 MW including one 30 MW generator and several smaller machines. The boilers had an output capacity of 1,080,000 pounds per hour (136 kg/s) of steam at 625 psi (43.1 bar) and 441 °C. In 1971 the station delivered 79.66 GWh of electricity.

The power station was given a 12 month notice of closure in October 1975, with full closure being effected in October 1976. The site was demolished in 1978 and is now occupied by commercial and industrial units.

Notes

References

Sources

External links
Valley Road power station, set back from the gas works with steam arising from its wooden cooling towers
Plan of the power station, with the concrete tower shown on the left (north side) and the wooden towers on the right (south side)
Mapping showing the power stations proximity to Valley Road Goods Yard

Power stations in Yorkshire and the Humber
Former power stations in England
Coal-fired power stations in England
Former coal-fired power stations in the United Kingdom
Buildings and structures in Bradford